Portmarnock railway station serves Portmarnock in County Dublin.

History
The station opened on 25 May 1844.

The ticket office is open from 5:45 AM to 2:30 PM, Monday to Friday. It is closed on Saturday and Sunday.

Connections
The station is served by the DART and Commuter services. Enterprise services pass from Dublin Connolly en route via Drogheda, Dundalk, Newry, Portadown, and Belfast Central.

Gallery

External links 
 Eiretrains - Portmarnock Station

Irish Rail Portmarnock Station Website

See also
 List of railway stations in Ireland

References

Portmarnock
Iarnród Éireann stations in Fingal
Railway stations opened in 1844
Railway stations in Fingal
1844 establishments in Ireland
Railway stations in the Republic of Ireland opened in 1844